Indaiabira is a municipality in the northeast of the Brazilian state of Minas Gerais.   the population was 7,339 in a total area of 1,008 km².  The elevation is 857 meters.  It became a municipality in 1997.

Indaiabira is part of the statistical microregion of Salinas.  It is surrounded by the following municipalities:  Rio Pardo de Minas, Vargem Grande do Rio Pardo, São João do Paraíso, and Taiobeiras.  It is connected by poor roads to the regional center of Salinas to the south.

This is one of the poorest municipalities in the state and in the country.  The main economic activities are cattle raising and farming with modest production of sugarcane, bananas, coffee, and rice.  In 2006 there were 1,222 rural producers with a total area of 37,230 hectares.  Cropland made up 4,000 hectares.  There were only 45 tractors.  In the urban area there were no financial institutions .  There were 101 automobiles, giving a ratio of about one automobile for every 70 inhabitants.  Health care was provided by 6 public health clinics.  There were no hospitals.

Municipal Human Development Index
MHDI: .571 (2000)
State ranking: 851 out of 853 municipalities 
National ranking: 5,094 out of 5,138 municipalities 
Life expectancy: 60
Literacy rate: 60 
Combined primary, secondary and tertiary gross enrolment ratio: .700
Per capita income (monthly): R$74.02 (For the complete list see Frigoletto)
Note that at last count Brazil had 5,561 municipalities while Minas Gerais still had 853.  
The above figures can be compared with those of Poços de Caldas, which had an MHDI of .841, the highest in the state of Minas Gerais.  The highest in the country was São Caetano do Sul in the state of São Paulo with an MHDI of .919.  The lowest was Manari in the state of Pernambuco with an MHDI of .467 out of a total of 5504 municipalities in the country .  At last count Brazil had 5,561 municipalities.  See Frigoletto

See also
List of municipalities in Minas Gerais

References

IBGE

Municipalities in Minas Gerais